The history and subculture surrounding transgender people in Singapore is substantial.

Singapore has one of the most progressive transgender attitudes in Asia. Sex reassignment surgery is legal in the country since 1973, the first country in Asia to legalise it. A citizen of Singapore is legally permitted to change the designation of their gender on government documents through self-determination. In 1996, marriage was legalised for transgender people.

History

National service
National service was implemented in 1967, whereby all 18-year-old males were required to train full-time for two years. Transgender was listed as a condition (later removed) in a Singapore Armed Forces (SAF) 'Directory of Diseases' and recruits who outed themselves to the examining doctors had their 'deployability' denied in sensitive positions. They were classified as Category 302 personnel, downgraded to a Physical Employment Status of C or E and assigned only non-combat roles at military bases.

Transgender individuals who have undergone sex reassignment surgery (SRS) do not need to serve National Service. However due to the difficulty of transitioning early, only a very small percentage of transgender people in Singapore undergo SRS before having to enter National Service. In rare cases, it's possible for transgender people to be exempted from National Service despite not undergoing sex reassignment surgery. However this is mostly up to the medical-officer in charge and varies case by case. In general, trans women that look like cisgender females have a much higher chance of being exempted.

Early sex reassignment surgery
As Singaporean gynaecological surgeons became more skilful, leaders in the field like Prof. S Shan Ratnam were authorised to perform sex reassignment surgery male-to-female (SRS) at Kandang Kerbau Hospital. Surgery on genitalia had been done prior to 1971, but only for patients who had both male and female reproductive organs. The first such operation in Asia took place in Singapore in July 1971. However, before patients could go under the knife, they first had to subject themselves to an exhaustive battery of tests and be given a clean psychological bill of health by then chief academic psychiatrist Tsoi Wing Foo. The surgery also was required to be approved by the Ministry of Health. This operation was the start of sexual reassignment surgery in Singapore, with the next operation done 3 years later in 1974.

Transitioning as a minor
Permission from guardians is required for those under 21 to undergo transition, but Hormone replacement therapy is not available for those under 18. It should be of note that minors transitioning face challenges in the school system, with a lack of accommodations for issues such as bathroom choice and school uniforms.

Legal reforms
"In 1973, Singapore legalised sex-reassignment surgery. A policy was instituted to enable post-operative transsexual people to change the legal gender on their identity cards (but not their birth certificates) and other documents which flowed from that. There was no specific provision in the statutes which allowed the Registrar to do this, so it existed probably only at the level of a policy directive. However, for over 20 years, this policy seemed to have operated smoothly."

Further developments in sex reassignment institutions
Later, the more technically demanding sex reassignment surgery female-to-male was also offered at Kandang Kerbau Hospital and at Alexandra Hospital, performed by gynaecologists such as Dr. Ilancheran. A Gender Identity Clinic (GIC) and Gender Reassignment Surgery Clinic were set up at the National University Hospital two decades later. It was headed by Prof. S Shan Ratnam until his retirement in 1995, after which leadership passed to his nephew, Dr. Anandakumar. In fact, for 30 years, Singapore was one of the world leaders in SRS, performing more than 500 such operations. This gave a new lease on life to the many transgender individuals whose bodies did not match their gender identity. As one consequence of this, Bugis Street and Johore Road started to become populated with a range of gendervariant people like cross dressers, gender non-conforming people, and trans people.

In the 1970s, a well-known transgender model was occasionally featured in Her World magazine.

Legalisation of transgender marriage
Since the mid-1970s, post-operative transgender people had been discreetly lobbying to be given the right to marry opposite-sex spouses. In 1996, a bill was presented before the Parliament of Singapore and the Women's Charter amended to read:
Avoidance of marriages between persons of same sex.
(1) A marriage solemnised in Singapore or elsewhere between persons who, at the time of the marriage, are not respectively male and female shall be void.
(2) It is hereby declared that, subject to sections 5, 9, 10, 11 and 22, a marriage solemnised in Singapore or elsewhere between a person who has undergone a sex reassignment procedure and any person of the opposite sex is and shall be deemed always to have been a valid marriage.
(3) For the purpose of this section
(a) the sex of any party to a marriage as stated at the time of the marriage in his or her identity card issued under the National Registration Act (Cap. 201) shall be prima facie evidence of the sex of the party; and
(b) a person who has undergone a sex reassignment procedure shall be identified as being of the sex to which the person has been reassigned.
(4) Nothing in subsection (2) shall validate any such marriage which had been declared by the High Court before 1 May 1997 to be null and void on the ground that the parties were of the same sex.

The minister moving the bill argued that since 1973, the government's intention was for people who had changed gender/sex to live a life according to their new gender, including the right to marry. Through an oversight, the law relating to marriage had not been re-aligned with the official policy to recognise sex reassignment surgery. Now that the courts had illuminated this inconsistency after a landmark case in which a woman sought and won the annulment of her marriage to a trans man (Lim Ying v Hiok Kian Ming Eric), it was necessary to amend the Women's Charter to ensure that the original intent was not undermined. Transgender people were officially granted their wish on 24 January 1996 via an announcement by MP Abdullah Tarmugi.

See also
 Singapore gay terminology
 LGBT rights in Singapore
 List of transgender-related topics

References

Further reading
Sisterhood by Leona Lo (Select Books, 2003)- a personalised emotional exposé of the local transvestite and transsexual community by an intellectual trans woman herself.
My Sisters: Their Stories by Leona Lo and Lance Lee (Viscom Editions Pte Ltd)
Cries from Within' by S. Shan Ratnam; Victor H. H. Goh and Tsoi Wing Foo – a tome on sex-reassignment surgery and its attendant psychological considerations by two eminent gynaecologists and a psychiatrist.

External links
 Transgender SG: A homegrown resource for transgender people in Singapore
 Yawning Bread's account of Singapore's transgender and sex-change history 
 Transgender People In Singapore

Transgender in Asia
LGBT in Singapore
Transgender marriage